The 1998 FIFA World Cup qualification competition was a series of tournaments organised by the six FIFA confederations. Each confederation — the AFC (Asia), CAF (Africa), CONCACAF (North, Central America and Caribbean), CONMEBOL (South America), OFC (Oceania), and UEFA (Europe) — was allocated a certain number of the 32 places at the 1998 FIFA World Cup. 174 teams entered the qualification rounds, while two places were reserved for France and Brazil as host nation and defending champions, respectively.

Qualified teams

 Norway was eliminated from the group stage of the 1994 World Cup, while they exited the 1938 tournament in the first round of what was then a pure knockout tournament.

Qualification process
The distribution by confederation for the 1998 FIFA World Cup was:
 AFC (Asia): 3 or 4 places
 CAF (Africa): 5 places
 CONCACAF (North America): 3 places
 CONMEBOL (South America): 4 places (+ Brazil qualified automatically as 1994 FIFA World Cup winners for a total of 5 places)
 OFC (Oceania): 0 or 1 place(s)
 UEFA (Europe): 14 places (+ France qualified automatically as host nation for a total of 15 places)

Confederation qualification

AFC

A total of 36 teams entered the competition. The Asian zone was allocated 3.5 places (out of 32) in the final tournament.

There were three rounds of play:
First round: The 36 teams were divided into 10 groups of 3 or 4 teams each. The teams played against each other twice, except in Group 10, where the teams played against each other once. The group winners would advance to the final round.
Final round: The 10 teams were divided into 2 groups of 5 teams. The teams played against each other on a home-and-away basis. The group winners would qualify. The runners-up would advance to the AFC play-off.
Play-off: The two teams played against each other once in Malaysia. The winner would qualify. The loser would advance to the AFC–OFC intercontinental play-offs.

Final positions (final Round)

Play-off for 3rd place

CAF

A total of 38 CAF teams entered the competition. However, Mali and Niger both withdrew before the draw was made. The African Zone was allocated five places (out of 32) in the final tournament.

There would be two rounds of play:
First Round: Cameroon, Nigeria, Morocco and Egypt, the four highest-ranked teams according to FIFA, received byes and advanced to the Final Round directly. The remaining 32 teams were paired up to play knockout matches on a home-and-away basis. The winners would advance to the Final Round.
Final Round: The 20 teams were divided into five groups of four teams each. The teams would play against each other on a home-and-away basis. The group winners would qualify.

Final positions (final Round)

CONCACAF

A total of 30 CONCACAF teams entered the competition. Mexico, the US, Costa Rica, Honduras, El Salvador and Canada, the six highest-ranked teams according to FIFA, received byes and advanced to the third round directly. The remaining 24 teams were divided into two zones, based on geographical locations, as follows:

Caribbean Zone: The 20 teams played in three rounds of knockout matches on a home-and-away basis to determine four winners advancing to the third round.
Central American Zone: The four teams were paired up to play knockout matches on a home-and-away basis. The winners would advance to the third round.

In the third round, the 12 teams were divided into three groups of four teams each. They played against each other on a home-and-away basis. The group winners and runners-up would advance to the final round.

In the final round, the six teams played against each other on a home-and-away basis. The top three teams would qualify.

Final positions (fourth round)

CONMEBOL

A total of 10 CONMEBOL teams entered the competition. The South American zone was allocated 5 places (out of 32) in the final tournament. Brazil, the defending champions, qualified automatically, leaving 4 spots open for competition between 9 teams.

The rules were very simple. The 9 teams would play against each other on a home-and-away basis. The top 4 teams would qualify.

Final positions

OFC

A total of 10 teams entered the competition. The Oceanian zone was allocated 0.5 places (out of 32) in the final tournament.

There were three rounds of play:
First Round: Australia, New Zealand, Fiji and Tahiti, the four best ranked teams according to FIFA, received byes and advanced to the Second Round directly. The remaining 6 teams were divided into 2 groups of 3 teams each, namely the Melanesian Group and the Polynesian Group, based on geographical considerations. The teams played against each other once. The winner of the Melanesian Group would advance to the Second Round. The runner-up of the Melanesian Group and the winner of the Polynesian Group would advance to the First Round Play-off. In the Play-off, they played against each other on a home-and-away basis. The winner would advance to the Second Round.
Second Round: The 6 teams were divided into 2 groups of 3 teams each. The teams played against each other twice. The group winners would advance to the Final Round.
Final Round: The 2 teams played against each other on a home-and-away basis. The winner would advance to the AFC / OFC Intercontinental Play-off.

Final positions (third round)

|}

UEFA

A total of 50 UEFA teams entered the competition. The European zone was allocated 15 places (out of 32) in the final tournament. France, the hosts, qualified automatically, leaving 14 spots open for competition between 49 teams.

The 49 teams were divided into nine groups, four groups of six teams and five groups of five teams. The teams would play against each other on a home-and-away basis. The group winners would qualify. The runners-up would be ranked according to their records against the 1st, 3rd and 4th-placed team in their groups, and the team with the best record would also qualify. The remaining runners-up would advance to the UEFA Play-offs.

In the play-offs, the 8 teams were paired up to play knockout matches on a home-and-away basis. The winners would qualify.

Final positions (first round)

Play-offs

|}

Inter-confederation play-offs: AFC v OFC

It was a two-legged home-and-away tie between the winners of the Oceania qualifying tournament, Australia, and the losing team in the AFC play-off from the Asian qualifying tournament, Iran. The games were played on 22 and 29 November 1997 in Tehran and Melbourne respectively. Australia was hoping to play in the FIFA World Cup for the first time since 1974 and Iran in 1978. The second game is known in Iran as the Saga of Melbourne.

Top goalscorers

19 goals 
 Karim Bagheri

14 goals
 Kazuyoshi Miura
 Predrag Mijatović

12 goals
 Iván Zamorano

11 goals
 Marcelo Salas
 Carlos Hermosillo 

6 goals
 Raúl Díaz Arce
 Ali Daei
 Choi Yong-soo
 Savo Milošević

References

External links
FIFA World Cup official site - 1998 World Cup qualification 
RSSSF - 1998 World Cup Qualification

 
Qualification
FIFA World Cup qualification